The Free Lebanon State, also known as the State of Free Lebanon, was an unrecognized separatist country in Western Asia. On 18 April 1979, Lebanese military officer Saad Haddad proclaimed the independence of a "Free Lebanon" out of the southernmost territory of Lebanon, amidst the hostilities of the Lebanese Civil War. Haddad was the founding commander of the South Lebanon Army, a quasi-military that aimed to serve the political interests of Lebanon's Maronite Christians during the conflict. Though the Free Lebanon State garnered no international recognition, it received support from neighbouring Israel; the South Lebanon Army and the Israel Defense Forces had established a working alliance with each other during the 1978 Israeli invasion of Lebanon. Despite being further bolstered by the 1982 Israeli invasion of Lebanon, the authority of the Free Lebanon State rapidly deteriorated following Haddad's death in 1984. In the post-Haddad era, Maronite governance continued in the form of the South Lebanon security belt administration, which remained intact under the umbrella of the 1985–2000 Israeli occupation of Southern Lebanon. Over the course of the South Lebanon conflict, the Maronite administration and the South Lebanon Army operated under Israel's supervision, ultimately collapsing upon the Israeli withdrawal in 2000.

History
The announcement was made on 18 April 1979. The following day, he was branded a traitor to the Lebanese government and officially dismissed from the Lebanese Army.

The Free Lebanon State's existence relied on Israeli logistic and (after 1982) military support, effectively making it a client-state of Israel. The Free Lebanon State functioned for several years as a semi-independent authority in South Lebanon, being in a complete political disconnection with the internationally recognized Lebanese government in Beirut. The government of Free Lebanon under Haddad's leadership had never received international recognition. Following the 1982 Lebanon War, much of the claimed territory of the Free Lebanon State became part of the South Lebanon Security Belt, under joint control of the Israeli Army and the Free Lebanon Army. The authority of the Free Lebanon State further deteriorated with the death of Saad Haddad in January 1984, following which only the military force of the self-proclaimed state continued to function, rebranded as the South Lebanon Army (SLA).

Communications
During the first two years of the South Lebanon conflict (1982–2000), Saad Haddad headed the Christian radio station "Voice of Hope", initially set up and funded by George Otis of High Adventure Ministries. The Voice of Hope was set up as a charitable endeavor to help the Christian enclave in Southern Lebanon, but it quickly became politicized, when Hadaad used it for political diatribes aimed at his many enemies. High Adventure billed it as the only privately owned radio station in the Middle East that was broadcasting the Gospel, but its message was often tainted by the
necessary affiliation with Hadaad's militia, as its operation depended upon his protection and authority, resulting in a very curious blend of scripture lessons and political commentary which the staff at the station could not control or regulate.

Economy

The beginning of the Good Fence coincides with the beginning of the civil war in Lebanon in 1976 and Israeli support for the predominantly-Maronite militias in southern Lebanon in their battle with the PLO. From 1977, Israel allowed the Maronites and their allies to find employment in Israel and provided assistance in exporting their goods through the Israeli port city of Haifa. The main border crossing through which goods and workers crossed was the Fatima Gate crossing near Metula. This provided essential economic stability to the administration of the Free Lebanon State and the later South Lebanon security belt administration.

Relationship with the United Nations
The freedom of movement of UNIFIL personnel and UNTSO observers within the Free Lebanon enclave remained restricted due to the actions of Amal and the Free Lebanon Army under Major Saad Haddad's leadership with the backing of Israeli military forces. During the 1982 Lebanon War, UN positions were overrun, primarily by the South Lebanon Army forces under Saad Haddad.

International recognition
The Free Lebanon State did not succeed in gaining recognition from any state with the exception of unofficial recognition by the State of Israel.

See also 
 History of Lebanon

References 

Former countries in the Middle East
Former unrecognized countries
States and territories established in 1979
States and territories disestablished in 1984
Deep states of the Lebanese Civil War